Joe Lefors (February 20, 1865 – October 1, 1940) was a lawman in the closing years of the Old West. He is best known for obtaining the confession that led to the conviction of gunman Tom Horn in 1903 for the alleged murder of 14-year-old sheepherder Willie Nickell.

Lefors was featured as a character in the 1969 film Butch Cassidy and the Sundance Kid, a role later portrayed by Peter Weller in the 1979 prequel Butch & Sundance: The Early Days.

Family
Lefors was born in Paris, Texas, to James J. Lefors and Mahala West.  His brothers Sam, Ike, Rufe, and Newton were all peace officers in some capacity.  Newton was killed in the line of duty serving as a Deputy U.S. Marshal in Indian Territory.   The town of Lefors, Texas is named for another brother, Perry.

Law enforcement career
Lefors first arrived in Wyoming in 1885 after working on a cattle drive that ended there. He played a minor role in the 1887 recovery of a large herd of cattle rustled by the Hole in the Wall Gang. He later worked as a Contract Livestock Inspector for Wyoming, where his job was to recover stolen livestock and apprehend cattle thieves. Lefors married his first wife, 16-year-old Bessie M. Hannum, in Newcastle, Wyoming on August 5, 1896.

In 1899, Lefors took part in a posse to capture those responsible for what would become known as the "Wilcox Train Robbery", committed by the Hole in the Wall Gang led by outlaw Butch Cassidy. The robbers eventually escaped into the Big Horn Mountains. Famed lawman and  Pinkerton agent Charlie Siringo worked heavily on that case, and would years later come into contact with Lefors in the process of working other cases, and would later indicate that Lefors was incompetent, at best, as a lawman. However, US Marshal Frank Hadsell appointed Lefors a Deputy US Marshal in October 1899. Lefors always claimed that Hadsell approached him to take that job based on his hard work on the Wilcox Robbery case. However, Lefors contributed to that case very little, if anything, and is not mentioned as a contributor at all in the official records of that investigation. It is more likely that Lefors asked Hadsell to give him the appointment, and eventually he asked often enough to get it.

Train robbers again robbed another Union Pacific train on August 29, 1900, near Tipton, Wyoming about fifty miles west of Rawlins, and this time Lefors led the posse. However, they again had no success, and the robbers escaped. That same year, former lawman, scout, tracker and longtime killer for hire Tom Horn began his investigation on the Wilcox robbery case, working on contract with the Pinkerton Detective Agency to solve the case, and with whom he had been employed many years before. He generated productive information which was later passed to Charlie Siringo via the agency, obtained from explosives expert Bill Speck. Through that information, the investigators were able to identify who had killed Sheriff Josiah Hazen, who had been killed during a chase of the train robbery suspects. Horn and Siringo identified Hazen's killers as being Wild Bunch gang members George Curry and Kid Curry. Horn allegedly killed rustlers Matt Rash and Isom Dart that same month, in his other job as a hired killer to fight cattle rustling for large cattle companies.

Later life

Little is known about Lefors' life after Horn's hanging. He was known to brag to others about his achievements, though his effectiveness as a law enforcement official was disputed.

In a January 1, 1902, letter to W.D. Smith in Helena, Montana, of the "Iron Mountain Ranch Company", Lefors discussed the prospect of infiltrating a gang, though on behalf of the cattle company, rather than law enforcement. Smith asked Lefors to recommend someone for the job, which paid a salary of $125 per month, to which Lefors recommended himself, citing his successful defeat of "Brown's Hole Gang" as credentials. In fact, Lefors had been unsuccessful in stopping the activities of the "Brown's Hole Gang".

Following the hanging of Horn, Lefors took the job offered in Helena, working there for many months, without success in countering the gang. He was fired in 1904, and little is known about his whereabouts after that.

He started working on an autobiography in 1935, called  Wyoming Peace Officer.  It was published in 1953. 

Joe Lefors died on October 1, 1940. He is buried in the Willow Grove Cemetery in Buffalo, Wyoming.

References

External links
 The Joe LeFors papers at the American Heritage Center

Further reading
Tom Horn's Story – A Confession? at www.tom-horn.com (communication by Lefors)

1865 births
1940 deaths
Lamar County, Texas
Lewis and Clark County, Montana
Lawmen of the American Old West